Jamaicaway (also known as The Jamaicaway) is a four-lane, undivided parkway in the Jamaica Plain neighborhood of Boston, Massachusetts near the border of Brookline.

History

Jamaicaway was designed by Frederick Law Olmsted as part of Emerald Necklace of green spaces extending from Boston Common on Beacon Hill to Franklin Park in Roxbury. Jamaicaway connects Riverway in the north with Arborway in the south.

Designed with carriages in mind during an era when Jamaica Plain was a sparsely inhabited streetcar suburb, Jamaicaway is now a well-traveled route for motor vehicles.  Adding to the volume of traffic is Jamaicaway's proximity to the Longwood Medical and Academic Area and to main roads leading to Forest Hills, West Roxbury and the densely populated suburbs of Norfolk County. The winding nature of the road, and its heavy use by commuters leads to many vehicle collisions.  

Many of the houses which line Jamaicaway are large and of architectural interest. The oldest houses were created by elite Bostonians for year-round or seasonal use. The person most mentioned in association with Jamaicaway today is probably James Michael Curley, the Irish American Mayor of Boston whose former house was long easy to spot, even after Curley's death, by the shamrock design incised in its shutters.

Major intersections
The entire route is in Boston, Suffolk County.

References

External links
Restoring Boston’s "Emerald Isles"
Frederick Law Olmsted National Historic Site
The Emerald Necklace Conservancy
"2 Killed in Early Morning Jamaicaway Crash" - October 19, 2014 - Boston Globe

Jamaica Plain, Boston
Emerald Necklace
Parkways in Massachusetts
Streets in Boston